John James Lyons (21 May 1863 – 21 July 1927) was an Australian cricketer who played in 14 Test matches between 1887 and 1897.

References

External links

Australia Test cricketers
South Australia cricketers
1863 births
1927 deaths
Australian cricketers
Cricketers from South Australia
People from Gawler, South Australia